This list of botanical gardens and arboretums in Nevada is intended to include all significant botanical gardens and arboretums in the U.S. state of Nevada

See also
List of botanical gardens and arboretums in the United States

References 

 
Arboreta in Nevada
botanical gardens and arboretums in Nevada